In 1996, Florida Panthers owner Wayne Huizenga purchased a 70% controlling interest in SportsChannel Florida, with Rainbow Media (by that time, a joint venture between Cablevision and NBC) retaining a minority 30% interest. That led Huizenga to move the NHL franchise's game telecasts from Sunshine Network to SportsChannel Florida for the 1996–97 season.

Radio

Notes
In 1993, Moynihan became the radio color commentator and pre- and post-game show host for the expansion Florida Panthers of the National Hockey League. His talk show was moved to 10 p.m. to 1 a.m to accommodate his Panthers duties. In June 1994, WQAM's vice president and general manager announced that Moynihan would not have his contract renewed.

Moller has been the Panthers' television color analyst since 2015, following eight seasons as the team's radio play-by-play announcer and nine years as a radio analyst before that. He is known for screaming a pop culture reference after Florida Panther goals, though not every goal, and not when the Panthers are out of the game. Examples such as references to Tracy Morgan on 30 Rock, a Christian Bale tirade, film quotes from Wedding Crashers, Jaws, and Forrest Gump are included on a YouTube clip produced by The Dan Le Batard Show with Stugotz. The goal calls by Moller were done in conjunction with The Dan Le Batard Show, which shared the radio station that hosts the Florida Panthers radio play-by-play. The show and listeners provide Moller with numerous pop culture references, and he then chooses what he likes and uses it during games. He is also the president of the Panthers Alumni Association.

McDonald filled in for Florida Panthers radio play-by-play man Randy Moller for three games when Moller became ill in January 2010.

Television

Notes
Potvin was a color commentator for Florida Panthers television broadcasts on FS Florida from  1993, paired with play-by-play announcers Dave Strader and Steve Goldstein, for over 16 seasons before being replaced by former Panthers player Bill Lindsay in 2009.

Strader called games for the Florida Panthers for the 2005–06 and 2006–07 seasons when not calling games for NBC or Versus.

See also
Historical NHL over-the-air television broadcasters

References

External links
Florida Panthers Broadcasters & Reporters
Randy Moller named new color analyst for Florida Panthers broadcasts on FOX Sports Florida
Panthers TV analyst retires. And college football, NFL and NBA media notes
Florida Panthers: Randy Moller Named New TV Color Analyst

Lists of National Hockey League broadcasters
 
broadcasters
SportsChannel
Fox Sports Networks
Bally Sports